The Loja tyrannulet (Zimmerius flavidifrons) is a species of bird belonging to the family Tyrannidae. It is found in southwestern Ecuador. It was formerly considered conspecific with the golden-faced tyrannulet.

References

Zimmerius
Birds described in 1860